The Good Life is a 1996 Spanish comedy film written and directed by David Trueba. The film was screened for the Directors' Fortnight and nominated for the Caméra d'Or at the 1997 Cannes Film Festival. In July 2007, it was nominated for the Crystal Globe. It won the Special Jury Prize at the 32nd Karlovy Vary International Film Festival.

Cast 
 Fernando Ramallo - Tristán
 Lucía Jiménez - Lucía
 Luis Cuenca - Abuelo
 Isabel Otero - Isabelle
 Joel Joan - Claudio
 Vicky Peña - Madre
 Jordi Bosch - Padre

References

External links 

1996 comedy films
1996 films
Spanish comedy films
1990s Spanish-language films
1990s Spanish films